La Milla del Páramo is a locality located in the municipality of Bustillo del Páramo, in León province, Castile and León, Spain. As of 2020, it has a population of 177.

Geography 
La Milla del Páramo is located 29km southwest of León, Spain.

References

Populated places in the Province of León